Bat & Ball railway station is on Bat & Ball Road in the suburban town of Sevenoaks in Kent, England. The station is managed by Southeastern although all trains that serve the station are Thameslink.

History 
The station opened in 1862 with the name "Sevenoaks". It was then, some years, named "Sevenoaks Bat & Ball" then renamed in 1950 to its current name. The name derives from the Bat & Ball Inn, a pub which no longer exists.

A long lease of the building was granted to Sevenoaks Town Council in 2017 for refurbishment supported by the Heritage Lottery Fund. Works began March 2018 – for a building re-opening in January 2019. It is a listed building in the initial, mainstream category, Grade II (two).

Facilities 
The station is near the hospital, in the ecclesiastical parish of St John's Hill and in the broader town council's civil parish. It is on a south coastbound route from London via  and via . The northbound platform has a bench under a shelter and in 2014 new benches and service tannoy have graced the other platform. The staffed office, after fading, ceased on 30 November 1991. Southeastern has fitted an electronic screen showing departures.

The station has a car park. Once free, in 2010 a fee of £3 per day to park began. This resulted in the displacement of parking by commuters into surrounding residential streets, particularly Chatham Hill Road. Per the local press, parking problems for local residents were common, whilst leaving the station's car park almost deserted.

A PERTIS "permit to travel" machine was at the entrance to the southbound platform, later replaced by a card payment-only ticket machine in 2016. Before de-staffing in 1991, it had converted from the previous NCR21 card ticket system to APTIS on 12 April 1988. A rare misprint on some tickets issued just after conversion to APTIS rendered the station BAT BALL.

As part of the refurbishment project undertaken by Sevenoaks Town Council the station building will house a public cafe, public toilets, and community meeting rooms, due to open January 2019.

Services 
All services at Bat & Ball are operated by Thameslink using  EMUs.

The typical off-peak service in trains per hour is:
 2 tph to London Blackfriars via 
 2 tph to 

During the peak hours, the service to London Blackfriars is extended to and from  via .

References 
References

Sources

External links

Buildings and structures in Sevenoaks
Railway stations in Kent
DfT Category F2 stations
Former London, Chatham and Dover Railway stations
Railway stations in Great Britain opened in 1862
Railway stations in Great Britain closed in 1917
Railway stations in Great Britain opened in 1919
Railway stations in Great Britain not served by their managing company
1862 establishments in England
Railway stations served by Govia Thameslink Railway